"Sunday Morning" is a song by American pop rock band Maroon 5. It was released on November 8, 2004, as the fourth single from their debut studio album Songs About Jane (2002). The single peaked at number 31 in the United States, becoming Maroon 5's fourth Top 40 single; it also peaked at number 27 in the United Kingdom and Australia.

An accompanying music video directed by Andy Delaney and Monty Whitebloom and was filmed at Abbey Road Studios and the Otto Dining Lounge in London. It features Maroon 5 performing the song, interspersed with scenes of numerous people singing it at a karaoke bar.

Song structure
The song, written in the key of C Major, follows a simple verse-chorus form preceded by an intro and uses the well known ii-V-I progression common in jazz, R&B and soul. The chords follow a sequence of Dm9-G13-Cmaj9 throughout the song.

Critical reception
Billboard called the single "another can't-miss romp from America's hottest pop-rock band."

Music video
The music video for "Sunday Morning" premiered on November 17, 2004, on MTV. The video begins in February, where the band are recording the song at Abbey Road. Three months later, at the Japanese bar a karaoke ascene which starts off with a Japanese man and a pair of women, both blonde and brunette, singing "This Love" and at the end, the band appears to perform the closing moments of the song. Adam Levine says the idea for the video struck the band when they were in Japan and noticed a few of their songs on the karaoke list at a Japanese bar.

Appearances in other media
"Sunday Morning" was featured on the film Something's Gotta Give (2003) and the television series Third Watch. The song appeared on the American soundtrack version of the British film Love Actually (2003), along with "Sweetest Goodbye". An acoustic version is featured on the band's live album 1.22.03.Acoustic and appeared in the family comedy film Cheaper by the Dozen 2 (2005). It is also featured on the karaoke video games Lips and Just Sing, both were included as downloadable contents. "Sunday Morning" was referenced from the 2018 song "Younger" by A Great Big World.

Remix versions
"Sunday Morning" was featured in the remix versions, which includes the "Urban Remix" was created by Mark Batson and the Jazz remix titled "Jazzy Mix", are available on Vinyl, the latter one also appeared on the Songs About Jane: 10th Anniversary Edition (2012), which was entitled as the demo version. Another remix was made by Questlove, appears on the band's remix album Call and Response: The Remix Album (2008).

Track listing

Charts

Weekly charts

Year-end charts

Certifications

Release history

References

Maroon 5 songs
2004 singles
2002 songs
A&M Octone Records singles
J Records singles
Songs written by Adam Levine
Songs written by Jesse Carmichael